The 2019–20 First Professional Football League, also known as Efbet League for sponsorship reasons, was the 96th season of the top division of the Bulgarian football league system, the 72nd since a league format was adopted for the national competition of A Group as a top tier of the pyramid, and also the 4th season of the First Professional Football League, which decides the Bulgarian champion. Ludogorets Razgrad were the defending champions after winning their 8th consecutive title in the previous season. On 21 June 2020 the team from Razgrad clinched its 9th championship with four games to spare after a 2:1 win home win over Beroe. The season began in July 2019 and was scheduled to end in May 2020, but was completed in July 2020.

Impact of the coronavirus pandemic

Suspension of championship and measures pertaining to fan attendance after resumption
After the possibility of playing matches without spectators was initially envisioned, on 13 March 2020, the Bulgarian Football Union decided to suspend all fixtures until 13 April in accordance with the measures taken to combat the COVID-19 pandemic. On 3 April 2020, the state of national emergency was extended until 13 May 2020 and on 11 April the Minister of Youth and Sports Krasen Kralev confirmed that no mass participation sports events and full training sessions will be held until that date. On 14 May, it was announced that footballers would be given the opportunity to train together over the course of the next three weeks, subject to the observance of strict rules and a gradual increase in the number of participants. The competitive matches resumed on 5 June (with the post-regular season phase – the championship and relegation rounds – shortened in half). The expectations in mid May were that no fans would be allowed, but on 2 June a decree by Minister of Health Kiril Ananiev permitted the presence of spectators, subject to the restriction that no more than 30% of the stadium capacity is occupied and social distancing in terms of seating is adhered to. On 12 June, it was decided that since 15 June the stadiums could be filled up to 50% capacity. On 23 June, a requirement of no more than 1000 spectators per section of the stands was imposed. The match between Vitosha and Tsarsko Selo was postponed from 26 June to 27 June after it was reported that four Vitosha players and a physiotherapist had tested positive for COVID-19, but their PCR tests eventually produced negative results. Due to a number of fans and Lokomotiv Plovdiv players who had tested positive in the aftermath of the Bulgarian Cup final, the 9 July match between Lokomotiv Plovdiv and CSKA Sofia (the same teams that contested the final) was held behind closed doors. After a continuous rise in the number of infections in the period between mid June and early July, in a decree valid from 10 July, spectators were once again forbidden to attend football matches.

Footballers with positive tests for COVID-19
In May 2020, prior to the restart of the matches, Emil Viyachki and Krasimir Stanoev tested positive for the coronavirus. Tomi Juric (in June 2020) and Martin Kavdanski's results (in July 2020) also turned out to be positive. In Kavdanski case, his initial result had come back negative due to a laboratory mix-up, as a result of which he played in the match against Cherno More on 2 July. On 6 July, it was announced that three additional Tsarsko Selo footballers as well as sixteen footballers and staff members from Cherno More had been identified as having the virus. Between 8 July and 10 July, it was officially confirmed that nine Lokomotiv Plovdiv players and two non-playing personnel members had been infected. Positive tests were also reported for two Dunav Ruse footballers and one from Botev Plovdiv. Infected footballers were subject to a 14-day quarantine, with the majority of them reportedly either asymptomatic or with mild symptoms that did not require hospitalization.

Teams
Fourteen teams are competing in the league – the top twelve teams from the previous season, and two teams promoted from the Second League.

Tsarsko Selo Sofia were promoted as champions of the 2018–19 Second League. This will be their debut in the Bulgarian top tier. Tsarsko Selo replaces Vereya, who were disqualified for match-fixing, ending their 3-year stay in the Bulgarian top tier.

The second team to be promoted was Arda, who earned promotion after winning their play-off match against Septemvri Sofia. Arda's win meant that the team will make their first appearance in the Bulgarian top tier, while Septemvri ended their two-year stay in the First League.

Stadiums and locations

Personnel and kits
Note: Flags indicate national team as has been defined under FIFA eligibility rules. Players and managers may hold more than one non-FIFA nationality.

Note: Individual clubs may wear jerseys with advertising. However, only one sponsorship is permitted per jersey for official tournaments organised by UEFA in addition to that of the kit manufacturer (exceptions are made for non-profit organisations).
Clubs in the domestic league can have more than one sponsorship per jersey which can feature on the front of the shirt, incorporated with the main sponsor or in place of it; or on the back, either below the squad number or on the collar area. Shorts also have space available for advertisement.

Managerial changes

Regular season

League table

Results

Positions by round

Results by round

Championship round

Championship round table
Points and goals will carry over in full from regular season.

Positions by round
Below the positions per round are shown. As teams did not all start with an equal number of points, the initial pre-playoffs positions are also given.

Relegation round
Points and goals will carry over in full from regular season.

Group A

Group B

European play-offs

Bracket

European play-off quarter-finals

European play-off semi-final

European play-off final

Relegation play-offs

Relegation group

Relegation finals

Dunav Ruse are relegated to the Third League.

Season statistics

Scoring

Top scorers

Hat-tricks

Clean sheets

Transfers
 List of Bulgarian football transfers summer 2019
 List of Bulgarian football transfers winter 2019–20

Notes

References

First Professional Football League (Bulgaria) seasons
Bul
1
First Professional Football League